is a 2016 Japanese jidaigeki samurai comedy film directed by Yoshihiro Nakamura. It was released in Japan by Shochiku on May 14, 2016.

The original story is  collected by "Unsung Heroes of Old Japan" written by 

This movie's catch phrase is ".

Plot
In 1766, residents in a town have a hard time due to the land tax and forced labor. Nine people, including Jusaburō Kokudaya (Sadao Abe), worry about the future of their town. They then set up a plan to save the town. The plan is to lend large amounts of money to Han (historical term for the estate of a warrior) and distribute the interest annually to the residents, but if they are caught, they will lose their lives.

Cast 
Kokudaya Family (Sake brewery)
Sadao Abe
Karen Iwata
Daiki Shigeoka
Sugawaraya Family (Tea master)
Eita
Maika Yamamoto
Asanoya Family (Sake brewery and Money changer)
Satoshi Tsumabuki
Mitsuko Kusabue
Tsutomu Yamazaki
Townspeople
Yūko Takeuchi
Yasufumi Terawaki

Yudai Chiba

Masahiko Nishimura

Yuzuru Hanyu as Date Shigemura
Ryuhei Matsuda

Reception 

Awards

See also 
Seven Samurai - directed by Akira Kurosawa (1954)
The Magnificent Seven (1960)
The Magnificent Seven (2016 film)

References

External links 
 

国恩記（こくおんき）の人々 - 宮城県大和町公式ホームページ - Taiwa Town that appeared in the movie as Yoshioka-juku.

Films directed by Yoshihiro Nakamura
Samurai films
Jidaigeki films
Japanese comedy films
2016 comedy films
Shochiku films
2010s Japanese films